Henri Savini (born 8 May 1975) is a retired French football midfielder.

Honours

Club
OGC Nice
 Coupe de France: 1997

References

1975 births
Living people
French footballers
OGC Nice players
Association football midfielders
Ligue 1 players
Ligue 2 players
France under-21 international footballers